Zaboli Rural District is a rural district (dehestan) in the Central District of Mehrestan County, in Sistan and Baluchestan province, Iran. At the 2006 census, its population was 17,359, in 3,851 families.  The rural district has 63 villages.

References 

Rural Districts of Sistan and Baluchestan Province
Mehrestan County